Narek Aslanyan (born 4 June 1996) is an Armenian international footballer who plays for Sevan FC, as a midfielder.

Career
Born in Yerevan, he has played club football for Pyunik.

He made his international debut for Armenia in 2017.

References

1996 births
Living people
Armenian footballers
Armenia international footballers
FC Pyunik players
Association football midfielders
FC Gandzasar Kapan players
Sevan FC players